Lučko is a settlement in the Novi Zagreb - zapad district of the City of Zagreb, located south of the Sava and southwest of the city center. Lučko is located near the Lučko interchange that connects the A1 motorway, the Zagreb bypass and the D1 and D3 state roads towards Karlovac, colloquially called "the old road to Karlovac". The two main economic activities in Lučko are trade in goods, mainly in the retail sector, and the rendering of commercial services.

History 

Lučko dates back to the 18th century, when it was noted as the first local village with a river crossing. The name derives from the Croatian word luka which translates to "harbor". The oldest church in the village can be traced back to the year 1779. As of the 2011 census, Lučko had a total population of 3,010. This corresponds to a population increase of 50% when compared to the census held in 1991.

Lučko Airport

The Lučko airport  is one of the oldest facilities in Lučko and one of the main reasons for the establishment of Lučko as a neighborhood. In 1947, it had become Zagreb's main airport, replacing the obsolete Borongaj airport. It remained Zagreb's main airport for a period of 15 years, up to the year 1962, when Zagreb Airport had been completed at its contemporary location near Pleso.

Today, Lučko airport is home to the Lučko Anti-Terrorist Unit, Croatia's special police unit. In addition, it serves as a sport airfield and military helicopter airbase.

The airport is maintained by Aeroklub Zagreb, a local airport operator based in Zagreb.

Motorway interchange

The Croatian A1 motorway passes south of Lučko. The interchange from where the A1 originates is named after Lučko. Nearby Lučko mainline toll plaza consists of 15 lanes. It is the most frequented toll plaza in Croatia. During the tourist season long lines of vehicles form at the toll station.

See also

 NK Lučko
 Stadion Lučko

References 

Neighbourhoods of Zagreb
Populated places in the City of Zagreb
Novi Zagreb